Palkon Ki Chhaon Mein 2 is an Indian drama television series. Produced by Rashmi Sharma Telefilms, premiered on 3 October 2022 on Dangal TV. It is the second installment of Rehna Hai Teri Palkon Ki Chhaon Mein, starring Vin Rana and Trupti Mishra, Ashish Dixit.

Synopsis
This is the story of Suman, a young orphaned woman, whose dreams of finding family and love come true when she gets a chance to be a part of an extremely lovable and traditional joint family.

Suman lives in a girls' hostel with her best friend Nandini, who hails from a rich, traditional and loving family. Nandini's mother Surabhi meets Suman and decides that this girl will be her future daughter-in-law. Suman meets Surabhi's son Nandan and they take a sudden liking for each other. To Suman's shock, it is revealed that she has been chosen for Anshuman, Nandan's elder brother. Suman is in a dilemma: She has to choose between her love for Nandan and the feelings of a family which has treated her like a daughter.

After facing many difficulties, Nandan and Suman get married. On the way the brakes on their car fail. Nandan shoves Suman out but is unable to get out himself. The car dives into a waterfall and Nandan is presumed dead. After that, the whole family begins to hate Suman, except for Anshuman and his new fiancée Tanya. But even Tanya becomes an enemy when she sees that Anshuman cares for Suman.

Meanwhile, Suman goes through many trials and tribulations. After a long time, she is once again accepted by her in-laws. By now, she and Anshuman are in love. They get married with the blessings of the family.

Cast and characters

Main
 Vin Rana as Anshuman Jha; Chanda and Mithilesh's elder son; Surabhi's step-son; Aarati's step-brother, Nandan and Nandini's step-elder brother, Suman's second husband (2022 -present)
 Trupti Mishra as Suman Anshuman Jha née Upadhyay; Nandan's former husband, Anshuman's husband, Nandini's sister-in-law (2022 - present)
 Ashish Dixit as Nandan Jha; Surabhi and Mithilesh's son, Anshuman's step-younger brother and Aarati's younger brother, Nandini's youngest elder brother, Suman's ex-husband, Tanya's husband, Suman and Anshuman's former rival (2022 - present)

Recurring
 Jaya Ojha as Surabhi Mithilesh Jha; Mithilesh's wife, Aarati, Anshuman, Nandan, Nandini's mother, Suman and Tanya's mother-in-law's (2022 - present)
 Jaya Bhattacharya as Manorama Jha;Surabhi's Sister. (2022 - present)
 Raj Premi as Devakinandan Jha; Mithilesh's father, Aarati, Anshuman, Nandan, and Nandini's grandfather, Surabhi, Suman and Tanya's grandfather-in-law (2022 - present)
 Sara Khan as Tanya Nandan Jha née Rastogi; Anshuman's ex-fiancée, Nandan's second wife, Suman's rival (2022 - present)
 Vishal Nayak as Sirish
 Seema Azmi as Mrs. Upadhyay - Suman's Aunt (Mami)
 Sandeep Mehta as Mithilesh Jha, Surabhi's husband; Nandini, Nandan and Anshuman's father
 Sheetal Rajankar as Nandini; Aarati, Nandan and Anshuman's sister; Surabhi's daughter.
 Rajesh Puri as Suman's Grandfather
 Lavneesh Dutta as Shikhar, Suman's brother
 Mehul Nisar as Mr. Upadhyay -Suman's Maternal Uncle
 Ashank Singh
 Rajan Verma
Ram Awana as Jaykhant (2022)
Meena Mir as Chanda(2023 - present)

Cameo appearances
 Sonal Khilwani as Bindiya Abhay Bharadwaj from Bindiya Sarkaar (2023)

Production
The show title is based on the 1977 film Palkon Ki Chhaon Mein. The shooting of the series began in September 2022, some initial sequences were also shot at Indore and Ujjain.

Ashish Dixit,Vin Rana and Trupti Mishra were cast as lead. Sara Khan was cast to portray the negative lead and joined by Vishal Nayak.

Palkon Ki Chhaon Mein 2 promos were released in September 2022. It premeried on 3 October 2022 on Dangal TV.

See also
 List of programmes broadcast by Dangal TV

References

External links
 
 

2022 Indian television series debuts
Hindi-language television shows
Indian television soap operas
Dangal TV original programming